Cyphomyrus is a genus of ray-finned fish in the family Mormyridae, the freshwater elephantfishes.

Species 
The following 7 species are currently assigned to this genus:

 Cyphomyrus aelsbroecki 
 Cyphomyrus cubangoensis 
 Cyphomyrus discorhynchus  (Zambezi parrotfish)
 Cyphomyrus lufirae 
 Cyphomyrus macrops 
 Cyphomyrus psittacus 
 Cyphomyrus wilverthi

References 

Mormyridae
Ray-finned fish genera